Wildwood Elementary School may refer to:

Wildwood Elementary School (British Columbia), in British Columbia, Canada
Wildwood Elementary School (California), in Piedmont, California, USA
 Wildwood Elementary School, in the Conejo Valley Unified School District, Thousand Oaks, California